Daniel Adeboboye (born May 12, 1999) is a professional Canadian football running back for the Toronto Argonauts of the Canadian Football League (CFL).

University career
Adeboboye played college football for the Bryant Bulldogs from 2018 to 2021. He played in 34 games where he had 1,816 rushing yards and 16 touchdowns along with 49 receptions for 264 yards and three touchdowns.

Professional career
Adeboboye was ranked as the 12th best player in the Canadian Football League's Amateur Scouting Bureau final rankings for players eligible in the 2022 CFL Draft. He was then drafted in the second round, 15th overall, in the 2022 draft by the Toronto Argonauts and signed with the team on May 10, 2022. Following training camp, he made the team's active roster as the backup running back to Andrew Harris and played in his first professional game on June 16, 2022, against the Montreal Alouettes, where he had three carries for ten yards. Following an injury to Harris, he had his first reception in a game, against the Hamilton Tiger-Cats, on August 12, 2022.

Adeboboye played in all 18 regular season games in 2022 where he had 15 carries for 72 yards, four receptions for 16 yards, and finished second on the team with 17 special teams tackles. He was the team's nominee for the CFL's Most Outstanding Special Teams player. He also played in both pre-season games, including his first Grey Cup championship win in the 109th Grey Cup game.

Personal life
Adeboboye was born in Mississauga to parents Marian and Tai Adeboboye and grew up in Toronto. He has two brothers and a sister. He is of Nigerian descent through his father.

References

External links
Toronto Argonauts bio 

1999 births
Living people
American football running backs
Bryant Bulldogs football players
Canadian football running backs
Players of Canadian football from Ontario
Sportspeople from Mississauga
Toronto Argonauts players
Canadian sportspeople of Nigerian descent